Athesis acrisione is a species of butterfly of the family Nymphalidae. It is found from Colombia and Ecuador.

Subspecies
Athesis acrisione acrisione (eastern Ecuador)
Athesis acrisione deflavata Niepelt, 1928 (Colombia)

References

Ithomiini
Nymphalidae of South America
Butterflies described in 1869
Taxa named by William Chapman Hewitson